The 1971 NAIA men's basketball tournament was held in March at Municipal Auditorium in Kansas City, Missouri. The 34th annual NAIA basketball tournament featured 32 teams playing in a single-elimination format. 

The championship game featured Kentucky State University for the second time. It was the fourth time since seeding began in 1957 that the number one team won the tournament.

Awards and honors
Leading scorer:
Leading rebounder:
Player of the Year: est. 1994

1971 NAIA bracket

  * denotes overtime.

Third-place game
The third-place game featured the losing teams from the national semifinalist to determine 3rd and 4th places in the tournament. This game was played until 1988.

See also
 1971 NCAA University Division basketball tournament
 1971 NCAA College Division basketball tournament

References

NAIA Men's Basketball Championship
Tournament
NAIA Division I men's basketball tournament
NAIA men's basketball tournament
College basketball tournaments in Missouri
Basketball competitions in Kansas City, Missouri